The 2020 Horizon League men's basketball tournament was the final event of the 2019–20 men's basketball season for the Horizon League, and the final event in the league's 2019-20 season. It began on March 3, 2020 and ended on March 10; first-round and quarterfinal games were played at the home courts of the higher seed, with all remaining games at Indiana Farmers Coliseum in Indianapolis. The winner received the conference's automatic berth into the NCAA tournament, though that was cancelled two days later due to the coronavirus pandemic, along with all other winter tourneys and spring sports.

Seeds
9 of 10 eligible teams participated in the tournament with the top 2 teams receiving byes to the semifinals. Detroit Mercy was ineligible for postseason play, including the conference tournament, due to low APR scores. Teams were seeded by conference record, then seeded further with tiebreakers for teams with the same win–loss records.

Schedule

Bracket

References

Tournament
Horizon League men's basketball tournament
College sports tournaments in Indiana
Basketball competitions in Indianapolis
Horizon League men's basketball tournament
Horizon League men's basketball tournament